The 1923 LSU Tigers football team represented Louisiana State University (LSU) as a member of the Southern Conference (SoCon) during the 1923 college football season. Led by first-year head coach Mike Donahue, the Tigers compiled an overall record of 3–5–1 with a mark of 0–3 in conference play. Doc Fenton and Moon Ducote were assistant coaches.

Schedule

References

LSU
LSU Tigers football seasons
LSU Tigers football